Rohitha Kottahachchi (born 9 August 1971) is a Sri Lankan former first class cricketer. He is now an umpire, and stood in a tour match between Sri Lanka Board President's XI and West Indians in October 2015.

References

External links
 

1971 births
Living people
Sri Lankan cricketers
Sri Lankan cricket umpires
People from Kalutara